The Perugia Crucifix (Italian - Crocifisso di Perugia ) is a gold and tempera on panel painted crucifix of the Christus patiens type. It is dated to 1272 thanks to an inscription on its base reading "ANNO DOMINI MCCLXXII TEMPORE GREGORI P.P.X.. It is held in the Galleria nazionale dell'Umbria, in Perugia.

It is one of a small number definitively attributed to the Master of Saint Francis. It was first attributed to him by Henry Thode in 1885.

References

1270s paintings
Collections of the Galleria Nazionale dell'Umbria
Crucifixes